Ijaz Ahmed (12 July 1949 – 28 December 1999) was a Pakistani first-class cricketer who played for Lahore cricket team. He played 109 First-class and 20 List A cricket matches.

References

External links
 

1949 births
1999 deaths
Pakistani cricketers
Cricketers from Lahore
Lahore cricketers
Punjab (Pakistan) cricketers
National Bank of Pakistan cricketers
Punjab University cricketers